Amir Chand Kumar (August 10, 1923 – January 25, 1980) was an Indian field hockey player who won a gold medal at each of the 1948 Summer Olympics and 1956 Summer Olympics.

References

External links
 

1923 births
1980 deaths
Olympic field hockey players of India
Field hockey players at the 1948 Summer Olympics
Field hockey players at the 1956 Summer Olympics
Indian male field hockey players
Olympic gold medalists for India
Olympic medalists in field hockey
Medalists at the 1956 Summer Olympics
Medalists at the 1948 Summer Olympics
Field hockey players from Lahore
Sportspeople from Lucknow
Field hockey players from Uttar Pradesh